Montserrat Puche Díaz (born 22 May 1970) is a former Spanish team handball player  and current coach. She competed at the 1992 Summer Olympics in Barcelona, where the Spanish team placed seventh. She also competed at the 2004 Summer Olympics in Athens, where the Spanish team reached the quarter finals, and placed sixth in the tournament.

References

External links

1970 births
 Living people
 People from Alcorcón
Handball players from the Community of Madrid
 Spanish female handball players
 Spanish handball coaches
 Olympic handball players of Spain
 Handball players at the 1992 Summer Olympics
 Handball players at the 2004 Summer Olympics
 Competitors at the 2001 Mediterranean Games
 Mediterranean Games silver medalists for Spain
 Mediterranean Games medalists in handball